This page shows results of Canadian federal elections on Vancouver Island.

Regional profile
Like most of British Columbia outside of Greater Vancouver, Vancouver Island tends to be a battleground between the Conservatives and the New Democratic Party (NDP). This is as true now, as has been in the past, except between 1988 and 2004. In 1988, the NDP swept the island in a wave of popular support that saw the party win the most seats in its history. This was wiped out in 1993 however, when many NDP voters switched to the Reform Party which won every seat except Victoria, which was picked up by the Liberals for the first time since 1968. This arrangement continued until the resurgence of the NDP in 2004, which led to it picking up Nanaimo—Cowichan, while the Liberals benefited by the seat switching of Keith Martin in Esquimalt—Juan de Fuca, whose personal popularity allowed him to be re-elected as a Liberal.

Since winning their first seat in the region in seventeen years in 2004, the NDP won two more seats here in 2006 picking up Victoria from the Liberals and Vancouver Island North from the Tories. The Tories won Vancouver Island North back in 2008. In 2011, the NDP picked up Esquimalt—Juan de Fuca from the Liberals while Green Party leader Elizabeth May defeated Tory cabinet member Gary Lunn in Saanich—Gulf Islands to win her party's first elected parliamentary seat in history. The Liberals failed to cross the 15 percent mark in any Vancouver Island-based riding. The island swung hard to the NDP in 2015; May was the only non-NDP MP elected here. In 2019, the Greens were able to pick up Nanaimo-Ladysmith, as well as win over 25% of the vote in Victoria and Esquimalt-Saanich Sooke. The Island is  now a 3 way race between the NDP, the Conservatives, and the Greens.

Votes by party throughout time

2021 - 44th General Election

|-
| style="background-color:whitesmoke" |Courtenay—Alberni
|
|Susan Farlinger9,27613.39%
|
|Mary Lee22,18132.03%
||
|Gord Johns30,61244.21%
|
|Susanne Lawson3,5905.18%
|
|Robert Eppich3,4675.01%
|
|Barbara Biley (M-L)1240.18%
||
|Gord Johns
|-
| style="background-color:whitesmoke" |Cowichan—Malahat—Langford
|
|Blair Herbert10,32016.37%
|
|Alana DeLong17,87028.35%
||
|Alistair MacGregor26,96842.78%
|
|Lia Versaevel3,9226.22%
|
|Mark Hecht3,9526.27%
|
|
||
|Alistair MacGregor
|-
| style="background-color:whitesmoke" |Esquimalt—Saanich—Sooke
|
|Doug Kobayashi14,46622.07%
|
|Laura Anne Frost13,88521.18%
||
|Randall Garrison28,05642.81%
|
|Harley Gordon5,8918.99%
|
|Rob Anderson2,9954.57%
|
|Tyson Riel Strandlund (Comm.)2490.38%
||
|Randall Garrison
|-
| style="background-color:whitesmoke" |Nanaimo—Ladysmith
|
|Michelle Corfield9,31413.54%
|
|Tamara Kronis18,62727.09%
||
|Lisa Marie Barron19,82628.83%
|
|Paul Manly17,64025.65%
|
|Stephen Welton3,3584.88%
|
|
||
|Paul Manly
|-
|rowspan=2 style="background-color:whitesmoke" |North Island—Powell River
|rowspan=2 |
|rowspan=2 |Jennifer Grenz7,92213.15%
|rowspan=2 |
|rowspan=2 |Shelley Downey21,67035.96%
|rowspan=2 |
|rowspan=2 |Rachel Blaney23,83339.55%
|rowspan=2 |
|rowspan=2 |Jessica Wegg3,6566.07%
|rowspan=2 |
|rowspan=2 |Paul Macknight2,7954.64%
|
|Stacey Gastis (Mav.)310 0.51%
|rowspan=2 |
|rowspan=2 |Rachel Blaney
|-
|
|Carla Neal (M-L)77 0.13%
|-
| style="background-color:whitesmoke" |Saanich—Gulf Islands
|
|Sherri Moore-Arbour12,05618.40%
|
|David Busch14,77522.55%
|
|Sabina Singh11,95918.25%
||
|Elizabeth May24,64837.62%
|
|David Hilderman1,9432.97%
|
|Dock Currie (Comm.)1410.22%
||
|Elizabeth May
|-
|rowspan=2 style="background-color:whitesmoke" |Victoria
|rowspan=2 |
|rowspan=2 |Nikki Macdonald18,19427.26%
|rowspan=2 |
|rowspan=2 |Hannah Hodson9,15213.71%
|rowspan=2 |
|rowspan=2 |Laurel Collins29,30143.90%
|rowspan=2 |
|rowspan=2 |Nick Loughton7,47211.19%
|rowspan=2 |
|rowspan=2 |John Randal Phipps2,0653.09%
|
|Jordan Reichert (Animal)273 0.41%
|rowspan=2 |
|rowspan=2 |Laurel Collins
|-
|
|Janis Zroback (Comm.)291 0.44%
|}

2019 - 43rd General Election

|-
| style="background-color:whitesmoke" |Courtenay—Alberni
|
|Jonah Baden Gowans8,62011.93%
|
|Byron Horner23,93633.12%
||
|Gord Johns29,79041.21%
|
|Sean Wood9,76213.51%
|
|
|
|Barbara Biley (M-L)1720.24%
||
|Gord Johns
|-
| style="background-color:whitesmoke" |Cowichan—Malahat—Langford
|
|Blair Herbert10,30115.79%
|
|Alana DeLong16,95926.00%
||
|Alistair MacGregor23,51936.06%
|
|Lydia Hwitsum13,18120.21%
|
|Rhonda Chen1,0661.63%
|
|Robin Morton Stanbridge (CHP)2020.31%
||
|Alistair MacGregor
|-
| style="background-color:whitesmoke" |Esquimalt—Saanich—Sooke
|
|Jamie Hammond12,55417.90%
|
|Randall Pewarchuk13,40919.12%
||
|Randall Garrison23,88734.06%
|
|David Merner18,50626.39%
|
|Jeremy Gustafson1,0891.55%
|
|Fidelia Godron (Ind.)990.14%Louis Lesosky (Ind.)1000.14%Philip Ney (Ind.)830.12%Josh Steffler (Libert.)2870.41%Tyson Strandlund (Comm.)1110.16%
||
|Randall Garrison
|-
| style="background-color:whitesmoke" |Nanaimo—Ladysmith
|
|Michelle Corfield9,73513.55%
|
|John Hirst18,63425.93%
|
|Bob Chamberlin16,98523.63%
||
|Paul Manly24,84434.57%
|
|Jennifer Clarke1,0491.46%
|
|James Chumsa (Comm.)1040.14%Brian Marlatt (PC)2070.29%Geoff Stoneman (Ind.)2350.33%Echo White (Ind.)710.10%
||
|Paul Manly
|-
| style="background-color:whitesmoke" |North Island—Powell River
|
|Peter Schwarzhoff8,25113.11%
|
|Shelley Downey20,50232.59%
||
|Rachel Blaney23,83437.88%
|
|Mark de Bruijn8,89114.13%
|
|Brian Rundle1,1021.75%
|
|Carla Neal (M-L)480.08%Glen Staples (Ind.)2870.46%
||
|Rachel Blaney
|-
| style="background-color:whitesmoke" |Saanich—Gulf Islands
|
|Ryan Windsor11,32616.62%
|
|David Busch13,78420.23%
|
|Sabina Singh8,65712.70%
||
|Elizabeth May33,45449.09%
|
|Ron Broda9291.36%
|
|
||
|Elizabeth May
|-
| style="background-color:whitesmoke" |Victoria
|
|Nikki Macdonald15,95222.30%
|
|Richard Caron9,03812.63%
||
|Laurel Collins23,76533.21%
|
|Racelle Kooy21,38329.89%
|
|Alyson Culbert9201.29%
|
|Robert Duncan (Comm.)1130.16%Jordan Reichert (Animal)2210.31%Keith Rosenberg (VCP)460.06%David Shebib (Ind.)1110.16%
||
|Murray Rankin†
|}<noinclude>

2015 - 42nd General Election

2011 - 41st General Election

2008 - 40th General Election

2006 - 39th General Election

2004 - 38th General Election

Maps 

Esquimalt-Juan de Fuca
Nanaimo-Alberni
Nanaimo-Cowichan
Saanich-Gulf Islands
Vancouver Island North
Victoria

2000 - 37th General Election

Notes

References

Vancouver Island
Political history of British Columbia
Vancouver Island